Wighnomy Brothers were an electronic music duo from Jena, Germany, composed of Gabor Schablitzki (aka Robag Wruhme) and Sören Bodner  (aka Monkey Maffia).  Wighnomy Brothers' live mixes include an eclectic blend of deep house, minimal techno, jazz, and soul, and their original releases are infused with a unique deep-house sound.  They have released their music on Freude-Am-Tanzen, Kompakt, Vakant,  and other electronic music labels.

History
Schablitzki and Bodner met in the late 1980s in Communist East Germany where they shared an interest in break dancing, hip-hop, and early electronica.  Schablitzki began producing with Volker Kahl in 1996 under the pseudonym "Beefcake."  By 1997, Schablitzki and Bodner became residents at the renowned "Club Kassablanca," and began producing original tracks as the "Wighnomy Brothers."

The Wighnomy Brothers have toured all over the world since then, but hadn't made their United States debut until May 21, 2009 at the Middlesex Lounge in Boston, Massachusetts at the Make It New night.

Schablitzki and Bodner appeared as main characters in Amy Grill's electronic music documentary "Speaking In Code," which chronicles the Wighnomy Brothers' rising popularity in the early 2000s and Gabor's subsequent break from techno music in 2006-07.

In late 2009, Schablitzki and Bodner announced that they will be retiring the Wighnomy Brothers project at the end of the year but will continue DJing and producing music separately.

Discography
Releases
 Ill Restorante Della (12"), Freude Am Tanzen, 2001
 Wighnomy EP (12", EP), Freude Am Tanzen, 2002
 24/7 You (12"), Nightclubbing Music, 2003
 Bodyrock EP (12", EP), Freude Am Tanzen, 2003
 Hide You Im Schrankwand Gewand (12"), WB Records 2003
 Something For Your Mind (Bewegungsmelder Remix) (12"), WB Records 2003
 Pusta Reime Im Knubbelbenz Verfahren (12"), WB Records, 2004
 Somewhere Over The Slippybergün (12"), WB Records, 2004
 Speicher 19 (12"), Kompakt Extra, 2004
 3 Fachmisch EP (12", EP), Freude Am Tanzen, 2005
 Crackerjack Acid EP (EP), Metromusic, 2005
 Nativetonguetwisterhood / Gottogoaway (12"), WB Records, 2005
 Speicher 31 (12"), Kompakt Extra, 2005
 Moppal Kiff (12"), Freude Am Tanzen, 2006
 Okkasion EP (12", EP), Freude Am Tanzen, 2006
 Guppipeitsche (12"), Freude Am Tanzen, 2007
 Metawuffmischfelge (CD, Comp, Mixed), Freude Am Tanzen, 2008
 Speicher 64 (12"), Kompakt Extra, 2009

External links
 wighnomy-brothers.de
 Freude-Am-Tanzen official site
 Wighnomy Brothers on Beatport
 Movement interview: Wighnomy Brothers on Beatportl

References

German electronic music groups